The 2017 Top Challenge League was the inaugural season of Japan's second-tier domestic rugby union competition, the Top Challenge League.

It was played from 9 September to 23 December 2017, with eight participating teams. Honda Heat won the competition for the second time – having previously won in 2014–15 – and won promotion to the 2018–19 Top League. Hino Red Dolphins, Mitsubishi Sagamihara DynaBoars and Kyuden Voltex finished second, third and fourth respectively to qualify for the promotion play-offs, while Kamaishi Seawaves finished seventh to qualify for the relegation play-offs. Chubu Electric Power finished eighth to be relegated to the third tier regional leagues for 2018.

Competition rules

In January 2017, the JRFU announced the format of the Top Challenge League competition. The competition was played in two stages. The First Stage was a round-robin format, where all eight teams played each other once.

The top four teams in the First Stage progressed to Group A of the Second Stage, while the bottom four teams progressed to Group B. Each of these groups was another round-robin, with all four teams playing each other once.

The team that finished top of Group A won automatic promotion to the 2018–19 Top League, while the other three teams in Group A progressed to promotion play-offs against the teams placed 13th, 14th and 15th in the 2017–18 Top League.

The team that finished bottom of Group B were relegated to the regional leagues for 2018. The winners of the Top East League, Top West League and Top Kyūshū League competed in a Regional Challenge, with the winner replacing the relegated team in the 2018 Top Challenge League. The second-bottom team in Group B progressed to a promotion / relegation play-off match against the runner-up of the Regional Challenge.

Teams

The following teams took part in the 2017 Top Challenge League competition:

First stage

Standings

The final standings for the 2017 Top Challenge League First Stage were:

 The top four teams qualified for the Second Stage Group A. Honda Heat carried 3 bonus points into the Second Stage, Hino Red Dolphins carried 2 bonus points into the Second Stage and Mitsubishi Sagamihara DynaBoars carried 1 bonus point into the Second Stage.
 The bottom four teams qualified for the Second Stage Group B. Kamaishi Seawaves carried 3 bonus points into the Second Stage, Mazda Blue Zoomers carried 2 bonus points into the Second Stage and Chugoku Red Regulions carried 1 bonus point into the Second Stage.

Matches

Round one

Round two

Round three

Round four

Round five

Round six

Round seven

Round eight

Round nine

Second Stage Group A

Standings

The standings for the 2017 Top Challenge League Second Stage Group A are:

 Honda Heat is promoted to the 2018–19 Top League.
 Hino Red Dolphins, Kyuden Voltex and Mitsubishi Sagamihara DynaBoars qualify for the promotion play-offs.

Matches

Round one

Round two

Round three

Second Stage Group B

Standings

The standings for the 2017 Top Challenge League Second Stage Group B are:

 Chugoku Red Regulions and Mazda Blue Zoomers remain in the Top Challenge League for 2018–19.
 Kamaishi Seawaves qualify for the relegation play-offs.
 Chubu Electric Power is relegated to regional leagues for 2018.

Matches

Round one

Round two

Round three

Promotion and relegation

 Honda Heat won promotion to the 2018–19 Top League as champions of the Top Challenge League, replacing the 16th-placed Kintetsu Liners.
 Hino Red Dolphins beat NTT DoCoMo Red Hurricanes in the promotion play-offs to win promotion to the 2018–19 Top League.
 Kyuden Voltex and Mitsubishi Sagamihara DynaBoars failed to win their matches in the promotion play-offs, remaining in the Top Challenge League for 2018–19.
 Chubu Electric Power were relegated to the 2018 regional leagues, and were replaced by 2017 regional league winner Kurita Water Gush.
 Kamaishi Seawaves won their relegation play-off against 2017 regional league runner-up Osaka Police to remain in the Top Challenge League.

Relegation play-offs

At the end of the season, the team placed seventh will play against the regional team placed second for a place in the 2018 Top Challenge League.

See also

 2017–18 Top League

References

Top Challenge League
Top
Top